Pietrasik is a Polish surname. Notable people with the surname include:

 Adam Pietrasik, Polish slalom canoeist
 Damian Pietrasik (born 1986), Polish Paralympic swimmer

Polish-language surnames